SK Uhelné sklady Prague is a football club located in Prague-Košíře, Czech Republic. It currently plays in the Prague Championship, which is in the fifth tier of the Czech football system.

External links
 Official website 
 SK Uhelné sklady Prague at the website of the Prague Football Association 

Football clubs in the Czech Republic
Football clubs in Prague
Association football clubs established in 1965